P. turris may refer to:
 Pennarhodeus turris, a mite species
 Phymorhynchus turris, a sea snail species found in Japan

See also 
 Turris (disambiguation)